"Every Little Kiss" is a song recorded by Bruce Hornsby and the Range. It was first released in May 1986 as the lead single from the band's 1986 album The Way It Is.

Background
The song was originally released as their debut single in early 1986. It peaked at number 72 on the Billboard Hot 100, at number 18 on the Mainstream Rock Tracks chart, and at number 37 on the Adult Contemporary chart. It was re-released in 1987 after the success of The Way It Is and peaked at number 14 on the Hot 100 in July of that year. The introductory passage of the song quotes "The Alcotts" movement from Charles Ives's Concord Sonata.

Charts

References

1985 songs
1986 debut singles
Bruce Hornsby songs
Songs written by Bruce Hornsby
RCA Records singles
Songs about kissing